Leon Colin Gemmell (12 March 1921 – 29 December 1992) was an Australian rules footballer who played with Fitzroy in the Victorian Football League (VFL).

Notes

External links 

1921 births
1992 deaths
Australian rules footballers from Victoria (Australia)		
Fitzroy Football Club players